Altars of Madness is the debut studio album by American death metal band Morbid Angel, released on May 12, 1989, by Combat Records/Earache Records. The album was recorded in December 1988 at Morrisound Recording in Tampa, Florida. The album is one of the earliest examples of death metal and is considered to have helped pioneer the sound along with Possessed's Seven Churches in 1985 and Death's Scream Bloody Gore in 1987, and set a new precedent for heaviness and extremity, both musically and lyrically. It is one of the most celebrated albums in death metal history, and one of the most influential heavy metal albums of all time.

Musical style, writing, and composition 
Frontman David Vincent's vocal style was influenced by the early English grindcore scene and fellow Floridian Chuck Schuldiner of Death. The album's style is also characterized by extremely fast performances, complex compositions, and technically demanding musicianship. Guitarist Trey Azagthoth has noted that psychedelic music was an inspiration for his writing on the album, particularly Pink Floyd. When writing guitar solos on the album, he abandoned the use of traditional scales and said that "I would just pick an area on the guitar and play it without really looking at it. I'd connect it in a different way." Speaking about his motivations at the time of writing and recording the album, Azagthoth said thatBack then, I really wanted to destroy everybody. I wanted people to have to work a lot harder after the fans witnessed what we had going on. I wanted to smoke people. I really believed that bands were challenging each other, trying to outdo each other and make each other quit - almost like the rivalries with East Coast and West Coast rappers. I really kind of thought people wanted to write parts that would engulf the whole world. I wanted to get onstage and have people go, "Holy shit - what the fuck is going on?" I wanted to write stuff that would make other bands run and hide. It's not really very nice, but that's what drove me."

Recording and release 
The album features a number of tracks that were originally recorded for what was supposed to be their debut album Abominations of Desolation, originally recorded in 1986 but which was only released in 1991. The band was unhappy with the final product of Abominations of Desolation, Azagthoth in particular, who did not believe it was what he had envisioned. In December 1988 the band returned to the studio to record what would become their true debut release, Altars of Madness. Almost all of the songs on that original demo recording have since been re-recorded and appeared on various Morbid Angel albums. The band has explained that in many ways they felt unprepared when they entered the studio, despite them having practiced extensively beforehand. The band chose the studio because it was located close to the band in Tampa, and considered it the preeminent studio at the time. David Vincent called it a "trial run", but that he was "really pleased that everything came together when it finally did."

Original vinyl and cassette pressings of Altars of Madness did not include "Lord of All Fevers and Plague"; this track has appeared as a bonus track on nearly all CD versions of the album (between "Maze of Torment" and "Chapel of Ghouls"), while the remastered 2002 release included remixes of three songs from the album, "Maze of Torment", "Chapel of Ghouls" and "Blasphemy". The album saw a 2006 DualDisc release with the 2002 remaster on the audio side and Live Madness 89 recorded at Nottingham Rock City on November 14, 1989, on the DVD side. The album was remastered and reissued by Earache Records in 2011 and 2015, and in May 2016 a 'Full Dynamic Range' remaster was released digitally and on vinyl. On November 23, 2018, there will be a digipak edition of the album, with remastered sound and the bonus tracks, along with a bonus clip of "Immortal Rites".

Artwork 
The cover artwork, by Dan Seagrave, depicts "a flat disk made of a fossil material, that has captured souls". Seagrave has said that,This was something I'd been working on at home, which the band saw partially finished. It consequently became my first Death Metal cover. Prior to that I'd been making album covers for British thrash bands like Warfare, and Hydravein. Even though I was 18 when I did it, I still think it's quite interesting. It's not supposed to be spherical as has been suggested. It's more like a flat disk made of a fossil material, that has captured souls.

Reception and legacy

Many death metal fans and critics consider Altars of Madness to be one of the best death metal albums of all time. Jason Birchmeier of Allmusic wrote that one "cannot deny its influence", and MetalSucks likewise wrote that it is "impossible to ignore the importance of this release to the death metal genre." UK magazine Terrorizer rates this album as both Morbid Angel's and death metal's finest hour, describing it as "bludgeoning and raw but also technical, exacting and intimidatingly consistent". Altars of Madness has appeared at the top of lists of the greatest death metal albums of all time by Decibel magazine and Terrorizer magazine. In April 2006, the album was inducted into the Decibel Hall of Fame. The magazine wrote that the album "would turn death metal both upside down and inside out." Robban Becirovic of Close-Up Magazine credits Altars of Madness with launching the popularity of death metal in Sweden:
"...Morbid Angel's Altars of Madness changed everything [about the Swedish scene]. Before that there was no clear distinction between death, speed, or thrash among regular metalheads. It was just brutal metal. But Altars of Madness opened people's eyes, and made us realize something new was going on. Everybody bought that record. Everybody. And thrash was executed by it – the whole genre just disappeared."

Track listing

Personnel

Morbid Angel 
David Vincent – bass, vocals
Trey Azagthoth – guitars
Richard Brunelle – guitars
Pete Sandoval – drums

Production
Dig – executive production
Morbid Angel – arrangement, production
Tom Morris – engineering, mixing

References

1989 debut albums
Morbid Angel albums
Earache Records albums
Albums recorded at Morrisound Recording
Albums with cover art by Dan Seagrave